Eric James Martin (17 August 1925 – 30 September 2015) played first-class cricket for Nottinghamshire between 1949 and 1959. He was born at Lambley, Nottinghamshire and died at Woodthorpe, also in Nottinghamshire.

Martin was a right-handed opening batsman. He was a regular player in the Nottinghamshire side in 1952, 1954 and 1955, and was awarded his county cap in 1954 when he made 977 runs at an average of more than 30 runs per innings.

References

1925 births
2015 deaths
English cricketers
Nottinghamshire cricketers
People from Gedling (district)
Cricketers from Nottinghamshire